{{Infobox criminal
| image_name         =P139 FELTON IN PRISON.jpg
| image_caption      =Felton in Prison, illustration from 'Cassell's illustrated history of England (1865)
| birth_name         =
| birth_date         = 
| birth_place        = possibly Suffolk, Kingdom of England
| death_date         = 
| death_place        = Tyburn, London, Kingdom of England 
| conviction         = Assassination of the Duke of Buckingham
| charge             = Murder
| conviction_penalty = Death by hanging
| conviction_status  = Executed by hanging
| motive             =
| occupation         = Soldier
| spouse             =
| parents            = 
| children           =
| module             = 
}}

John Felton ( – 29 November 1628) was a lieutenant in the English Army who stabbed George Villiers, 1st Duke of Buckingham to death in the Greyhound Pub of Portsmouth on 23 August 1628.

King Charles I trusted Buckingham, who made himself rich in the process but proved a failure at foreign and military policy. Charles gave him command of the military expedition against Spain in 1625. It was a total fiasco with many dying from disease and starvation. He led another disastrous military campaign in 1627. Buckingham was hated and the damage to the king's reputation was irreparable. Buckingham's assassination by Felton was widely celebrated by members of the public in England, even after his execution.

Early life
John Felton was born around 1595, possibly in Suffolk, to a family related to the Feltons of Playford in Suffolk and distantly related to Thomas Howard, 21st Earl of Arundel. His father, Thomas Felton, prospered as a pursuivant, one appointed to the task of hunting down those who refused to attend Anglican church services (see recusancy). His mother, Elanor, was the daughter of William Wight, the one-time mayor of Durham.

The family's fortunes declined when Thomas' lucrative position was given to Henry Spiller in 1602. Thomas died around 1611, while he was imprisoned in the Fleet Prison for debt although his widow was later able to secure a £100 per annum pension from the crown.

Army career
Nothing is known of John Felton's life until the mid-1620s, when he was an army officer. He served in the Cádiz Expedition of 1625, an attempt to capture the Spanish city of Cadiz that was backed by Buckingham. This resulted in a decisive Spanish victory, with 7,000 English troops and 62 out of 105 ships lost. Felton then served as a lieutenant in Ireland in 1626, during which time his commanding officer died and Felton tried, but failed, to be appointed as his replacement.

In May or June 1627, Felton petitioned to be appointed a captain on Buckingham's military expedition of 1627, part of the Anglo-French War of 1627 to 1629. The purpose of the expedition was to capture the French fortress of Saint-Martin-de-Ré on the Île de Ré. This would secure the sea-approaches to the city of La Rochelle and encourage the French Huguenot population of the city to rebel against the French crown.

Felton had connections in political circles. But despite help from two Members of Parliament, Sir William Uvedale and Sir William Beecher, his initial request to join the expedition was turned down. Two months later, he was appointed a lieutenant with the second wave of troops that left for the Île de Ré in August 1627.

The expedition was a disaster for the English; the troops were ill-supplied and lacked the large artillery needed for the siege they laid at Saint-Martin-de-Ré. Many were lost on 27 October, during a final, desperate assault on the fortress of Saint-Martin that failed because the attackers' siege ladders were shorter than the walls of the fortress. The English evacuated soon after, losing 5,000 out of 7,000 troops during the campaign.

After returning to England, Felton lived in London for nine months. Although his mother, brother and sister lived in the city, he did not stay with them but lived in a lodging house. Those who encountered him during this time later described him as being taciturn and melancholic. His sister recalled that, since his return from Ré, Felton had been "much troubled by dreams of fighting". This was possibly indicative of what would be described as post-traumatic stress disorder in modern terms. During this time, Felton submitted petitions to members of the Privy council over two matters, £80 of back-pay he believed he was owed, and his promotion to captain, which he believed he had been unfairly denied. He had no success in resolving these grievances and came to believe the Duke of Buckingham was responsible for both of them.

Assassination of Buckingham

Buckingham was hugely unpopular in the land for the national disgrace of defeat by the French, although, with the help of the king, Charles I, he had avoided legal moves against him by Parliament for corruption and incompetence. By August 1628, Felton had come to believe that his personal grievances against Buckingham were part of a larger picture of treacherous and wicked governance of England by the Duke. He resolved to kill Buckingham and, after saying goodbye to his family, traveled to Portsmouth. Buckingham was staying there while trying to organise a new military campaign.

On the morning of Saturday 23 August, Buckingham left his lodgings, the Greyhound Inn in Portsmouth, after having breakfast. Felton was able to make his way through the crowd that surrounded Buckingham and stabbed him in the chest with a dagger. He missed a chance of escape in the ensuing chaos and, shortly after the murder, he presented himself before the crowd that had gathered and, expecting to be well received, announced his guilt. He was immediately arrested and taken before magistrates, who sent him to London for interrogation.

Aftermath
The authorities were convinced Felton had not acted alone and were anxious to get from him the names of any accomplices. The privy council attempted to have Felton questioned under torture on the rack, but the judges resisted, unanimously declaring its use to be contrary to the laws of England.

The unpopularity of the Duke meant Felton's action was met with widespread approval. While he was awaiting trial, it was celebrated in poems and pamphlets. Copies of written statements he carried in his hat during the assassination were also widely circulated. A poem by the Oxford scholar and cleric Zouche Townley claimed that Felton had saved England and King Charles from the corruption of Buckingham's politicking. The number of surviving copies of this work suggest it was widely circulated. However, contemporary reports state Townly fled to Holland after it became known he was the author.

An anonymous poem, Upon the Duke's Death, begins

The work goes on at length with an argument that claims Buckingham's assassination was not even a crime, arguing that the Duke himself had been a criminal who had placed himself above the law.

Other works contrasted the Duke, who was claimed to be popish, cowardly, effeminate and corrupt, with Felton, who was described as Protestant, brave, manly and virtuous. The writer Owen Feltham described Felton as a second Brutus.

The son of Alexander Gill the Elder was sentenced to a fine of £2,000 and the removal of his ears, after being overheard drinking to the health of Felton, and stating that Buckingham had joined King James I in hell. However these punishments were remitted after his father and Archbishop Laud appealed to King Charles I.

After being tried and found guilty, Felton was hanged at Tyburn on 29 November 1628. In a miscalculation by authorities, his body was sent back to Portsmouth for exhibition where, rather than becoming a lesson in disgrace, it was made an object of veneration. A gulf was revealed between a public who revered Felton, and the authorities that punished him.

A dagger, alleged to have been the one used by Felton, was displayed at least until the 19th century at Newnham Paddox in Warwickshire, the seat of the Earls of Denbigh. How the Earls of Denbigh acquired it can be explained by the fact that Buckingham's sister, Susan, married William Feilding, 1st Earl of Denbigh.

 In fiction 
The Three Musketeers
Felton's assassination of the Duke was fictionalised in Alexandre Dumas, père's The Three Musketeers (1844) and features in several film adaptations of the novel.

In Dumas's novel, Felton is portrayed as a Puritan who serves the fictional Lord de Winter. Felton is entrusted by de Winter to guard Milady de Winter, the widow of his brother and a French spy. Milady's master Cardinal Richelieu has ordered her to have Buckingham murdered so that he will not aid the Huguenot cause in the city of La Rochelle. As they question each other she puts on a façade of sorrow and broken innocence, even pretending to be a Puritan like Felton, and inventing a story of being drugged and raped by the duke. Milady manages to seduce Felton in a matter of days. They finally escape together, and Felton is sent to stab Buckingham, which he then justifies on the grounds of his lack of promotion in order to protect Milady. However, Felton realises that he has been deceived when Milady sails away without him, and he is left to be hanged for his crime.

In the 1961 French film Les Trois Mousquetaires, Felton was played by Sacha Pitoëff; in 1969 film of the Three Musketeers, Felton is played by Christopher Walken.

In the 1973 film The Three Musketeers and its 1974 sequel The Four Musketeers, Felton is played by Michael Gothard. Felton appears briefly in the first film as a Puritan servant of the duke of Buckingham (Lord de Winter does not appear in the films). The second film portrays his gradual seduction by Milady at some length, and then his assassination of Buckingham, carried out under her influence.

Other works
Felton is the central character in a play by the dramatist Edward Stirling. Called John Felton; or the Man of the People, it was first performed at the Royal Surrey Theatre in 1852.

The Duke's assassination features in Philippa Gregory's novel Earthly Joys (1998). In Ronald Blythe's novel The Assassin (2004), Felton is depicted as a complex character whose motives for the assassination are altruistic.

See also
 List of assassinations

References
Citations

Bibliography
 
—— "Libel in Action: Ritual, Subversion and the English Literary Underground, 1603–1642" in Tim Harris, The Politics of the Excluded, c. 1500–1800 (2001), contains a section about public responses to the assassination.

External links
D'Israeli, Isaac. "Felton, the Political Assassin", Curiosities of Literature''
Memorials & Monuments in Portsmouth Cathedral: The Duke of Buckingham

Attribution

1590s births
1628 deaths
English army officers
English assassins
Executed English people
People executed by Stuart England
17th-century English people
People executed by the Kingdom of England by hanging
Executed assassins
Murder in 1628